High Prussian is a group of East Central German dialects in former East Prussia, in present-day Warmian-Masurian Voivodeship (Poland) and Kaliningrad Oblast (Russia). High Prussian developed in the 13th–15th centuries, brought in by German settlers mainly from Silesia and Thuringia, and was influenced by the Baltic Old Prussian language.

Classification

High Prussian is a Central German dialect formally spoken in Prussia. It is separated from its only adjacent German dialect, Low Prussian, by the Benrath line and the Uerdingen line, the latter dialect being Low German. This was once one of the, if not the hardest linguistic border within the German dialects.

Those Borussisms are:
 Loss of /-n/ in infinitives (mache for Standard German , "to make");
 retention of the prefix //ge-// in the participe perfect passive (compare Meckelenburg German  to Low Prussian he is jelopen) (This is common in Central and High German, but rare in Low German);
 delabialization (Kenig, Brieder, Freide, Kreiter -  ("king"),  ("brothers"),  ("friends"),  ("weed"));
 nuscht in stead of Standard German  ("nothing"); and
 preference for diminutive suffixes (and Low Prussian de lewe Gottke -  ("to come"),  ("you"),  ("post man"),  ("dear God")) - and diminutives without umlaut (Hundchen, Katzchen, Mutterchen -  ("small dog"),  ("small cat/ kitten")  ("mother/ elderly woman")).

History

Origin of the dialect
J. A. Lilienthal, a teacher from Braunsberg, first recorded the term "Breslauisch" for High Prussian as an endonym in Warmia in 1842. Thereafter, it was considered obvious that Warmia was settled by Silesians, who brought their dialect with them. Based on a comparison of toponymy, at least for Oberländer, Thuringia was seen as a potential origin, too. The prevailing assumption was that the upper class emigrating to Prussia, most of which is known have come from Thuringia, would have brought their peasants with them. Walther Mitzka disputed this insisting on using linguistic criteria only. He determined that High Prussian deviated from the Silesian characteristics recognized as such in linguisitcs, leading him to conclusion that High Prussian could not be of Silesian origin. Instead, within the East Central German dialects, he found the greatest linguistic affinity with the dialects of Lower Lusatia, the core of which lay between Lübben in the west and Guben in the east. Based on those findings, Mitzka developed the theory that Central German settlers, whose arrival can be precisely determined by numerous tangible facts, left Mark Lausitz between 1290 and 1330, when political turmoils made settling in Prussia appear more attractive.

Erhard Riemann tested Mitzka's theory using further toponymy and concluded that the material was not sufficient to allow a reliable location of the origin of High Prussian. These lead to different regional dialects in Eastern Central Germany or to even wider spread among the dialects of Central German. According to Riemann, we must therefore reckon with a stronger mixture of origins of the settlers and, when deriving Breslau, we should be satisfied with the statement that its origin lies somewhere in a very large area in East Central German, within which Lower Silesia and Lower Lusatia may have formed focal points.

Fate after 1945
Almost all High Prussian speakers were evacuated or expelled from Prussia after 1945. Since the expellees scattered throughout Western Germany (with some exceptions, like the Ermländer settlement on a former military training area in Heckenbach/Eifel) the dialects are now moribund. Most of the High Prussian speakers not expelled after World War II relocated from Poland to Western Germany in the 1970s and 1980s as so-called late repatriates. Today, the language is almost extinct, as its use is restricted to communication within the family and gatherings of expellees, where they are spoken out of nostalgia. In Poland, the language of the few non-displaced people was subjected to severe repression after 1945, which meant that the active use of the language was even lower than in Germany. In both countries, the High Prussian dialects were not transmitted to the next generation, therefore, few elderly speakers remain. The German minority in Poland, recognized since 1991, uses Standard German.

Geographic distribution

They were separated from the Low Prussian dialect area by the Benrath line isogloss to the west, north and east; to the south they bordered on the Polish Masurian dialect region. The places where Oberländisch was spoken, included Marienburg, Preußisch Holland and Freystadt.

Breslauisch

Geographic distribution
Breslauisch (also: Breslausch, Ermländisch) was mainly spoken in between the cities of Wormditt, Heilsberg, Bischofsburg and Allenstein.
This area is almost identical to the portion of the former Prince-Bishopric of Ermland governed by the bishop, which settled it with Central German peasants. The northern part was settled with Low German speakers by the cathedral chapter.

Phonology 
Linguistic features in consonantism are:
 The prefix //er-// appears as [dəɐ] ( -  ("freeze to death"));
 /b/ in initial position is mostly realized as [b], seldom as [p] (for Standard German  ("farmer"),  ("butter"),  ("bush")). Intervocalic /b/ is often realizes as [v] (-  ("to rub"),  ("to exercise"),  ("to dye"),  ("calves")). Before consonants it is normally realized as [f] (-  ("pea"),  ("hawk"));
 WestGermanic /p/ (Standard German /pf/) is realized as [f] (-  ("pepper"),  ("horse"),  ("pipe")), only following nasals and geminated it is realized as [p] (-  ("vapor"),  ("swamp"),  ("pan"),  ("to knock"));
 /g/ becomes [j] in the prefix //ge-//, intervocalic and following liquids (-  ("held [past participle of to hold]"),  ("tomorrow")). It becomes [g] before front vowels and liquids (-  ("yesterday"),  ("to greet")). Word initial it is realized as [k] (-  ("no [pronoun]"),  ("against"));
 /k/ can be either [c] (-  ("to germinate"),  ("child")) or [kʰ] (-  ("calf"),  ("head"));
 /nt/, /nd/ are mostly realized as /ŋ/ (-  ("to bind"),  ("hour"));
 word final /r/ is realized as [ɐ], sometimes represented as <ř>; and
 /s/ is realized as [ʃ] after [r] ( -  ("brush")).

Dialect sample 
  -  ("The ermlandic peasant and the devil") - A fairy tale
  -  ("In the Ermland the mouth appears to be big")

Oberländisch
Oberländisch was mainly spoken in the districts of Preußisch Holland and Mohrungen and in the adjacent area east of the Vistula.

According to popular opinion, the Oberland was settled in the 13th and 14th century by Thuringian peasants. They are said to have brought some of their town names with them (Mohrungen - Mohrungen [nowadays a quarter of Sangerhausen], Saalfeld - Saalfeld, and Mühlhausen - Mühlhausen). In line with Mitzkas theory, the village names merely reflect the origin of the upper classe settled there. Many settlement foundings were done by the patron of the Commendam of Christburg Sieghard von Schwarzburg, who was from Thuringia. For the most part, the German villages in the Oberland were established between 1290 and 1330.

In the Commendam of Christburg, encompassing most of the Oberland, Old Prussians made up half of the inhabitants. Therefore, the Old Prussian language influenced the German dialect of the Oberland (e.g. Old Prussian  :  ("girl")).

Further subdivisions 
While Breslauisch is a relative homogenous dialect, the Oberländisch dialect is permeated by several isogloss lines, according to Gerog Wenker, who collected data around 1880. He claimed, that this shows a dialect continuum between two extreme forms. He postulates that the dialects of the south west (district of Rosenberg in Western Prussia) were closest to Standard German while those of the north east (district of Preußisch Holland) were closest to Breslauisch. Accroding to him, the dialect of the area surrounding Lauck (in the farthest east of Preußisch Holland) were almost identical to Breslauisch. In his view, the local dialects of Mohrungen we the transition forms.

The last two Wenker sentences (Nr. 39 and 40) should exemplify this:

According to Stuhrmann, Mitzka, Ziesemer, Teßmann Oberländisch forms a uniform subdialect. According to Kuck and more recent Szulc the language of the former district of Rosenberg had as special subdialect of High Prussian, which they called Rosenbergisch.

Phonology 
The phonological characteristics mentioned above for Breslauisch do mostly apply to Oberlänisch, too, and are therefore common High Prussian features. The following features are the most prominent ones:
 Oberländisch keeps /b/ in all positions als [b];
 /r/ is realized as [r]; and
 the gutturalization of /nt/ and /nd/ appears word internal only (-  ("child"),  ("children")).
Teßmann lists the following features as prominent:
 Breslauisch /-ich/ is Oberländisch /-ik/ (common coda of adjectives and numeralia);
 Oberländisch preserves Middle High German /-er-/, while Breslauisch has /-ar-/; and
 the same is true for /ɛ/ becoming /a/ in Breslauisch.

Dialect sample
  (Wenker-sentence Nr. 11 form Groß Arnssdorf, approximately in the center of the Oberlandisch sprachraum)

August Schemionek published the following anectode in 1881, in which the Oberländisch subdialect of Elbing is featured:

See also
 German dialects
 Low Prussian
 Masurian dialect

References

Literature 
 Walther Kuck: Dialektgeographische Streifzüge im Hochpreußischen des Oberlandes. In: Teuthonista 4, 1928, Heft 3/4, S. 266 ff.
 Lehmann: Die Volksmundarten in der Provinz Preußen. In: Preußische Provinzialblätter 1842, S. 5–63. Digitalisat
 J. A. Lilienthal: Ein Beitrag zu der Abhandlung „Die Volksmundarten in der Provinz Preußen“ im Januar-Hefte d. J. In: Preußische Provinzialblätter 1842, S. 193–209. Digitalisat.
 Walther Mitzka: Grundzüge nordostdeutscher Sprachgeschichte. Halle (Saale): Niemeyer 1937. Digitalisat.
 Victor Röhrich: Die Besiedlung des Ermlandes mit besonderer Berücksichtigung der Herkunft der Siedler. Braunsberg 1925.
 August Schemionek: Ausdrücke und Redensarten der Elbingschen Mundart mit einem Anhange von Anekdoten dem Volke nacherzählt. Danzig: Bertling 1881.
 Aleksander Szulc: Nachträgliches zu Forschungsgeschichte und Lautlehre des Hochpreußischen. In: Peter Ernst und Franz Patocka (Hrsg.): Deutsche Sprache in Raum und Zeit. Wien: Edition Praesens 1998.
 Wilhelm Teßmann: Hochpreußisch und Schlesisch-Böhmisch-Mährisch mit den Sprachinseln des Südostens. Selbstverlag, 1968. Eintrag im Katalog der deutschen Nationalbibliothek.
 Wilhelm Teßmann. Kurze Laut- und Formenlehre des Hochpreußischen (des Oberländischen und des Breslauschen). Würzburg : Holzner 1969 (Jahrbuch der Albertus-Universität zu Königsberg/Preußen. Bd. 19, 1969, S. 115–171). Eintrag im Katalog der deutschen Nationalbibliothek.
 Peter Wiesinger: Phonetisch-phonologische Untersuchungen zur Vokalentwicklung in den deutschen Dialekten. Band 1 und 2. Walter de Gruyter, Berlin 1970 (Studia Linguistica Germanica 2).
 Ewa Żebrowska: Die Äußerungsgliedfolge im Hochpreußischen. Olsztyn : Wydawn. Uniwersytetu Warmińsko-Mazurskiego 2004. ISBN 83-7299-377-7.
 Walther Ziesemer: Die ostpreußischen Mundarten. Proben und Darstellung. Breslau: Hirt 1924. Digitalisat.
 Walther Ziesemer: Die ostpreußischen Mundarten. In: Ostpreußen. Land und Leute in Wort und Bild. Dritte erweiterte Auflage. Königsberg (Preußen): Gräfe und Unzer o. J. [um 1926], S. 78–81.

External links

Central German languages
German dialects
East Prussia